Shibipatti is a village gram panchayat located in the Madhubani district of Bihar, India.

Mithila
Villages in Madhubani district